Dr. Rufino de Elizalde (August 1822, Buenos Aires – March 1887) was an Argentine politician who was Foreign Affairs Minister of Argentina in 1865.

References

1822 births
1887 deaths
People from Buenos Aires
Argentine people of Basque descent
Foreign ministers of Argentina
Burials at La Recoleta Cemetery